The 2014 season is Club Atlético River Plate's 3rd consecutive season in the top-flight of Argentine football. The season began on August 8, 2014 and ended on December 14, 2014.

Season events
The season was six months long due to a decision from AFA
to change the July–June calendar to January–December.

On May 27, Ramón Díaz resigned after leading the team to win the 2014 Torneo Final and 2014 Superfinal.

On June 7, Marcelo Gallardo signed as new coach of the team.

On December 10, River Plate secured its first international title in 17 years, the 2014 Copa Sudamericana.

Squad

Transfers

In

Out

Friendlies

Pre-season

Mid-season

Primera División

League table

Copa Sudamericana

Squad statistics

Appearances and goals

References

Club Atlético River Plate seasons
River Plate